Makanalua (also Makanaloa) is an unincorporated community and ahupuaʻa in Kalawao County, Hawaii, United States. During the Great Māhele of 1848, the land was retained for Princess Kekauʻōnohi. The name means "double gift" in the Hawaiian language.

Notes

Unincorporated communities in Kalawao County, Hawaii
Unincorporated communities in Hawaii